The Carmignano Visitation is a c.1528-1530 oil on panel painting of the Visitation by Pontormo, now in the propositura dei Santi Michele e Francesco in Carmignano (PO, Italy).

Unmentioned in Vasari's Lives of the Artists, the painting is usually attributed to the years just after Pontormo's work on the Capponi Chapel. Originally on the Pinadori family altar, it has remained in the church for which it was painted for almost its whole existence. A preparatory drawing for it is now in the Uffizi, with the squaring for its transfer to the panel. Its rhombus composition is based on that of Four Witches, a 1497 print by Dürer. In the foreground of the painting, we see Mary, St. Elizabeth, and two handmaids. While, on the left, in the background, there are two mysterious people to be identified, perhaps as St. Joseph and Zacharias. 

It inspired Bill Viola's video work The Greeting (1995), which for a time was exhibited in a room next to the painting. The painting has appeared in the temporary exhibitions Pontormo e Rosso Fiorentino. Divergenti vie della maniera (Palazzo Strozzi, Florence, 2014) and Bill Viola. Rinascimento elettronico (Palazzo Strozzi, Florence, 2017).

References

1520s paintings
Paintings of the Visitation
Paintings by Pontormo
Carmignano